Free, Blonde and 21 is a 1940 American drama film directed by Ricardo Cortez and written by Frances Hyland. The film stars Lynn Bari, Mary Beth Hughes, Joan Davis, Henry Wilcoxon, Robert Lowery, Alan Baxter and Kay Aldridge. The film was released on March 29, 1940, by 20th Century Fox.

Plot

Jerry Daily and Carol Northrup are residents of a New York City hotel for women. Jerry fakes a suicide out of anger for her married lover spurning her. At the hospital, administrator Dr. Hugh Mayberry takes a liking to Carol, while young surgeon Dr. Steve Greig falls for Jerry.

Carol and Hugh hit it off and end up marrying. Jerry, however, two-times Steve with a gangster, Mickey Ryan, who robs and murders a tavern owner and is wounded in the process. Jerry pleads with Steve to operate on Mickey, who dies anyway.

After police suspicions point them toward Hugh as an accomplice, Steve confesses that he was the doctor in question. He doesn't inform on Jerry, but the cops trick her into an admission of guilt and take her away.

Cast  
Lynn Bari as Carol Northrup
Mary Beth Hughes as Jerry Daily
Joan Davis as Nellie
Henry Wilcoxon as Dr. Hugh Mayberry
Robert Lowery as Dr. Stephen Greig
Alan Baxter as Mickey Ryan
Kay Aldridge as Adelaide Sinclair 
Helen Ericson as Amy McCall
Chick Chandler as Gus
Joan Valerie as Vickie
Elyse Knox as Marjorie
Dorothy Dearing as Linda
Herbert Rawlinson as John Crane
Kay Linaker as Mrs. John Crane
Thomas E. Jackson as Inspector Saunders
Richard Lane as Lieutenant Lake
Frank Coghlan Jr. as Sammy
Jerry Fletcher as Hotel clerk
Edward Cooper as Butler

References

External links 
 

1940 films
20th Century Fox films
American drama films
1940 drama films
American black-and-white films
Films scored by Samuel Kaylin
Films directed by Ricardo Cortez
1940s English-language films
1940s American films